Winslow Paul Oliver (born March 3, 1973) is a former American football running back in the National Football League for the Carolina Panthers and the Atlanta Falcons.

Career
Oliver is a 1991 graduate of Kempner High School in Sugar Land, Texas.  He also attended the University of New Mexico, where he set a number of team records and was awarded the 1996 Hula Bowl MVP.

In the third round of the 1996 NFL Draft (#73 overall pick) Oliver was selected by the Panthers.  He played for the Panthers for three seasons, mainly on special teams.  His jersey was #20.  The highlight of his career was an 84-yard punt return for a touchdown against the New Orleans Saints on September 8, 1996.

He became a free agent and played for the Falcons in the 1999 and 2000 seasons, before being released.  In 1999 he wore #33, before switching to #26 his last year in the NFL.

1973 births
Living people
People from Houston
American football running backs
American football return specialists
Kempner High School alumni
New Mexico Lobos football players
Carolina Panthers players
Atlanta Falcons players